Machrihanish Bay is a large remote tidal north by northeast coastal facing embayment, located next to the Campbeltown Airport within Argyll and Bute, Scotland. It is located on the west coast of the Kintyre peninsula. Machrihanish Bay has the longest continuous stretch of sand in Argyll.

Settlements

The closest settlement to Machrihanish Bay is the small village of Machrihanish which sits on the headland at the south end of the bay. Directly east of the bay sits Campbeltown Airport (RAF Machrihanish) and further east on the other side of the peninsula, a distance of  sits the town of Campbeltown. To the north of the airport and close to the northern shore of the bay, is the village of West Darlochan. The main A83 Road follows the west coast of the Kintyre peninsula, when traveling south,  until it reaches the north coast of the bay, where it cuts east through the peninsula, to miss the airport, cutting through the small villages of Kilchenzie,  Glencraigs, Drumore before finally meeting Campbeltown. The B842 road leaves Campbeltown traveling in a westerly direction, and passes through the small village of Stewarton, before reaching the bay as the B843.

Geography
To the north of the bay, around  lies Bellochantuy Bay. To the south of the bay, lies Earadale Point, where the peninsula starts to curve inwards to the east.  To the south of the bay lies the forested hill of The Slate, with the larger hill of Cnoc May which overlooks the bay, 4 miles to the northeast. The river Machrihanish Water flows into the bay.

Gallery

References

Bays of Highland (council area)
Bays of Scotland
Bays of Argyll and Bute